CVID may refer to:

Common variable immunodeficiency
Complete, Verifiable and Irreversible Dismantlement of North Korea's nuclear program, or,
Complete, Verifiable and Irreversible Denuclearization of North Korea's nuclear program
The FourCC identifier for the video codec Cinepak, formerly called Compact Video